Marina Grande is the main port of the island of Capri in Italy, to the north of the main town of Capri and at the foot of Mount Solaro.

History
The Marina Piccola, on the island's southern shore, preceded the Marina Grande; it was used by Augustus and Tiberius. An ancient fishing port, the Romans used the Marina Grande as a port during Augustian times, and built the Palazzo a Mare nearby. Tiberius fortified and reinforced Marina Grande. Capri was also the first point in Campania in which the Greeks landed and women on Capri are still said to "still sometimes show distinctly Grecian features". In the seventh century, Bishop Costanzo died near Marina Grande and became the island's patron saint; the Chiesa di San Costanzo is situated between Marina Grande and Anacapri.

Geography
Marina Grande is located on the northern side of the island. Travel between the Marina Piccola and the Marina Grande occurs by circling around the Faraglioni stacks. Before 1928, docking took place directly in the bay, but it has since been developed into a port and seaside resort with a notable beach, which is the largest on the island. A small square overlooks the port surrounded by "the characteristic houses of Capri, rendered typical by the terraces, the balconies, the open galleries and the multi-coloured facades of the town, brightened by the "Pompeian red", which is one of the most intense notes of colour along the whole Neapolitan coast." The town is also characterized by steep terraced slopes with Mediterranean flora. A Corinthian capital lies on a high pedestal at the end of the western wharf, testament to the Roman presence in the area.

Transport

Boats operate between Marina Grande and Naples on the mainland, and also on excursions to visit the Blue Grotto. Funicolar, the cableway which is run by SIPPIC, connects the harbour to the city centre's Piazzetta; as does bus with Anacapri. As of 2012, the price of a one way railway ticket to Capri town was €1.50.

Tourism
Notable hotels include Villa Marina Capri, Hotel Excelsior Parco Capri, Relais Maresca, and Hotel Bristol. Ristorante Pizzeria Lo Zodiaco lies on the harbour front. An annual festival in honour of the Madonna della Libera is held on the Marina Grande in the middle of September.

References

External links

 Marina Grande
 Ferry Time table Naples - Capri and other harbours
Marina Grande di Capri A cluster of colorful houses, home to Capri's fishermen, and the island's biggest beach.
Hotels
JK Place Capri website
Villa Marina Capri website

Ports and harbours of Italy
Capri, Campania
Resorts in Italy